Osmoderma eremita, the hermit beetle or Russian leather beetle, is a species of European beetle in the family Scarabaeidae. Adults reach between 28 and 32 mm in length.

Distribution
Osmoderma eremita can be found everywhere in Europe, except for the United Kingdom, Iceland, Ireland, Malta, Portugal, and San Marino.

Larvae
The larvae develop in hollow trees. Oak is the preferred kind of tree, but the larvae may develop in any tree species with suitable hollows. Due to extensive scientific research, O. eremita is the most well known insect species associated with ancient or hollow trees. For instance, research has addressed the beetles' dispersal biology, population dynamics, and chemical communication. Trained conservation detection dogs are being used in monitoring larvae in Italy.

Conservation status
Due to habitat loss and fragmentation, the species has decreased all over its distribution range. For this reason the species is protected in most European countries, and has been given the highest priority according to the EU's Habitats Directive.

References

External links
 
 
 Species summary
 Encyclopedia of Life: Osmoderma eremita distribution
 LIFE Rosalia: Osmoderma eremita

Cetoniinae
Beetles of Europe
Beetles described in 1763
Taxonomy articles created by Polbot
Taxa named by Giovanni Antonio Scopoli